Peter Gerard Dunphy (born 1 June 1966) is a City of London Common Councilman for the Ward of Cornhill, film producer and former staffing business CEO.

Early life
Born in 1966 at Consett, County Durham, Dunphy was educated at St Bede's Catholic School, Lanchester.

Career
Dunphy is a business investment adviser and was previously and investment director of James Caan's Hamilton Bradshaw Private Equity, the CEO of FRG Recruitment and the former CEO of recruitment company, Dryden Human Capital (formerly Darwin Rhodes Group), at the time the largest insurance staffing firm globally. He successfully sold the business in 2012 to private equity funds.

Also a film producer (as Peter Gerard Dunphy), he has acted as Executive Producer for over a dozen films including Mad to Be Normal starring David Tennant, Elisabeth Moss, Gabriel Byrne and Michael Gambon; Funny Cow starring Maxine Peake, Paddy Considine and Stephen Graham; Two Graves with Cathy Tyson, Dave Johns and David Hayman; the feature length autobiographical The Quiet One about Bill Wyman of The Rolling Stones and the feature-length documentary Bicycle.

Politics
Dunphy is a member of the Liberal Democrat Party for which he stood unsuccessfully as parliamentary candidate for Hornsey and Wood Green in the 1992 general election, the 1994 Dagenham by-election, and for Walthamstow in the 2001 general election. Between 2012 and 2018 he served as the LibDem Party's Registered Treasurer responsible for overseeing financial compliance. Peter Dunphy Consulting has donated £152,637 (£138,658 personally) to the Party over several years.

An Independent City Common Councilman for the Ward of Cornhill, being elected in 2009 and re-elected in 2013, 2017 and 2022, he was elected Chairman of the City's Licensing Committee in 2016. Dunphy was, along with former MP Heidi Allen, founding director of Unite to Remain, the electoral pact between parties which supported remaining in the European Union at the 2019 UK general election.

Charitable work
Dunphy is a Trustee of the Honourable The Irish Society, serving as Deputy Governor between 2019 and 2021, and is a Liveryman of the Worshipful Company of Drapers.

References 

Living people
1966 births
Councilmen and Aldermen of the City of London
Liberal Democrats (UK) people
British chief executives